Christopher Robin Haskins, Baron Haskins (born 30 May 1937, Dublin) is an Irish businessman, life peer, and former member of the British Labour Party.

Early life
The son of a Protestant farmer, he attended St Columba's College, Dublin, and Trinity College, Dublin, where was known as a student radical and member of the Campaign for Nuclear Disarmament. Graduating with an honours degree in modern history, he contemplated becoming a journalist but later joined De La Rue.

Career
Haskins proposed to marry Gilda Horsley, whose father consented upon condition that Haskins joined the family business, Northern Dairies, based in Yorkshire, England. Haskins agreed and joined the company in 1962. Haskins foresaw the huge demand for good quality prepared meals, and turned the company into Northern Foods, whose brands include Ski yoghurt and Bowyers sausages, while Marks and Spencer are the company's largest customer for ready meals. Haskins became a director in 1967, deputy chairman in 1974, and was chairman from 1980 to 2002.

House of Lords
Haskins was ennobled as a life peer with the title Baron Haskins, of Skidby, in the County of the East Riding of Yorkshire, on 25 July 1998. During 2001, at the height of the foot and mouth disease epidemic, he became Prime Minister Tony Blair's 'rural tsar'. Lord Haskins retired from the Lords on 1 December 2020.

In August 2005, it was revealed that Haskins had donated £2,000 to the campaign of Scottish Liberal Democrat Member of Parliament for Inverness, Nairn, Badenoch and Strathspey, Danny Alexander. Following an investigation, Haskins was expelled from the Labour party for this action. He subsequently sat as a crossbencher.

He has been Chairman of the Better Regulation Task Force and a member of the New Deal Task Force. A pro-European, he was a leading member of the Britain in Europe campaign, the House of Lords European Sub-Committee, and is a former Chairman of the European Movement. He was a fellow board member of Yorkshire Forward and also Chairman of the Council of the Open University. In 2016, he was chair of the Humber local enterprise partnership.

References

External links

Lord Haskins at TheyWorkForYou
Lord Haskins at The Public Whip

1937 births
Living people
Businesspeople from Dublin (city)
Irish expatriates in England
Businesspeople from Yorkshire
Alumni of Trinity College Dublin
Labour Party (UK) life peers
Crossbench life peers
People educated at St Columba's College, Dublin
Irish emigrants to the United Kingdom
Life peers created by Elizabeth II